Rafael Cid Martínez (born June 2, 1995, in Mexico City) is a Mexican professional footballer who currently plays for Cruz Azul Hidalgo on loan from UNAM.

External links
 

Living people
1995 births
Association football defenders
Club Universidad Nacional footballers
C.D. Tepatitlán de Morelos players
Liga MX players
Liga Premier de México players
Tercera División de México players
Footballers from Mexico City
Cruz Azul Hidalgo footballers
Mexican footballers